The 1982–83 William & Mary Tribe men's basketball team represented the College of William & Mary during the 1982–83 college basketball season. The Tribe competed in the ECAC South and played their home games at Kaplan Arena. They finished the season 20–9 (9–0 in ECAC South competition) but lost in the championship game of the 1983 ECAC South men's basketball tournament to James Madison. This season also marked the first-ever conference title for William & Mary's men's basketball program.

Roster

Schedule and results
Source
All times are Eastern

|-
!colspan=9 style="background:#006400; color:#FFD700;"| 1983 ECAC South men's basketball tournament

|-
!colspan=9 style="background:#006400; color:#FFD700;"| 1983 National Invitation tournament

References

William and Mary Tribe
William & Mary Tribe men's basketball seasons
William and Mary
William and Mary Tribe
William and Mary Tribe